Lurton is a surname. Notable people with the surname include:

Lurton Blassingame (1904–1988), notable American literary agent
André Lurton (1924–2019), French winemaker and winery owner
Horace Harmon Lurton (1844–1914), American jurist and Justice of the Supreme Court of the United States

See also
Château Couhins-Lurton, Bordeaux wine from the Pessac-Léognan appellation
Blurton
Luton